Rangana Fort/ Prasiddhagad is located in the Bhudargad taluka of Kolhapur district. This fort is one of the important forts in the district. This fort is located on the Sahyadri mountain ridge, on the boundary of Sindhudurg and kolhapur district

History
This fort was built by the King Bhoj-II of the Shilahar dynasty in 12 th century. In 1470 this fort was captured by Md. Gavan of Bahamani dynasty. Later it was under the control of Sawant rulers  of Adilshahi dynasty. In 1658 the Rustum Jaman, commander-in chief of Adilshah won it from the Sawants. Jijabai undertook a special drive and captured the fort on 15.8.1666. This fort was under the control of Karvir kings for a longer period until the British took control in 1818. In December 1664 by a series of surprise attacks Shivaji Maharaj defeated the combined forces of Bijapur and the Desais and captured the Rangna Fort. Lakham Sawant and the Desais fled to Portuguese territory.

Places to see
There is a pilgrimage ashram of Mouni Maharaj on the way from Patgaon village. In the year 1676 Shivaji Maharaj took blessings from the Maharaj before proceeding for the Southern conquest. After walking for few steps there is an old Bhadrakali temple.  There are two gates, a large lake and temple of goddess Ranganai devi on the fort.

References 

16th-century forts in India
Forts in Maharashtra